Chaddock may refer to

Charles Gilbert Chaddock (1861–1936), American neurologist 
Chaddock reflex, described by Charles Gilbert Chaddock
Chaddock Hall, a medieval hall house on Chaddock Lane, Tyldesley, Greater Manchester, England
Chaddock College, a school for boys in Quincy, Illinois

See also
Chattock (disambiguation)